On Top of Our Game is the second studio album by Atlanta-based rap group Dem Franchize Boyz, released on February 7, 2006.

Track listing

Other versions
There is a deluxe version of the album with a bonus DVD, and there is also another version of this album which was chopped and screwed by Michael 5000 Watts for the Swishahouse label.

Track listing (chopped and screwed)
 My Music feat. Bun B 4:49
 I Think They Like Me [So So Def Remix] feat. Jermaine Dupri, Da Brat & Bow Wow 6:04
 Ridin' Rims 6:20
 Don't Play with Me feat. Three 6 Mafa 5:18
 You Know What It Is 4:39
 Suckas Comes & Try Me 4:31
 Lean wit It, Rock wit It feat. Peanut & Charley 4:57
 Freaky as She Wanna Be feat. Trey Songz 7:15
 Bricks 4 From The High feat. Jim Jones & Damon Dash 6:13
 They Don't Like That 4:47
 Stop Callin' Me 5:30
 Give Props 6:48

Sales
The album debuted at number 5 on the Billboard 200 with 106,000 copies sold in its first week. Since then it has been certified Gold by the RIAA.

Chart positions

Weekly charts

Year-end charts

References

2006 albums
Dem Franchize Boyz albums
Virgin Records albums
Albums produced by Jermaine Dupri